Irene Usabiaga Balerdi (born 22 September 1993) is a Spanish road and track cyclist. In 2015, she won the bronze medal in the elimination race at the 2015 UEC European Track Championships in Grenchen, Switzerland. She was part of the UCI women's road team  between 2012 and 2014. She won gold medals in the team pursuit and the scratch race at the 2012 Spanish National Track Championships.

Major results

2010
 1st  Road race, National Junior Road Championships
2011
 National Junior Road Championships
2nd Time trial
3rd Road race
 7th Time trial, UEC European Junior Road Championships
2012
 National Track Championships
1st  Scratch
1st  Team pursuit
2015
 Trofeu CAR Anadia Portugal
1st Omnium
2nd Scratch
 3 Jours d'Aigle
1st Scratch
2nd Individual pursuit
 3rd  Elimination race, UEC European Track Championships
 10th Overall Vuelta a Burgos Feminas
2017
 2nd Points race, Trofeu Ciutat de Barcelona–Memorial Miquel Poblet

References

External links

1993 births
Spanish female cyclists
Living people
Place of birth missing (living people)
Spanish track cyclists
Cyclists at the 2019 European Games
European Games competitors for Spain
People from Ordizia
Sportspeople from Gipuzkoa
Cyclists from the Basque Country (autonomous community)
21st-century Spanish women